Dana Meadows may refer to:
 Donella Meadows, an American environmental scientist and writer
 Dana Meadows (California), a location in Yosemite National Park
 Dana Meadows (Pakistan), a location in Kaghan Valley